Solidago juncea, the early goldenrod, plume golden-rod, or yellow top, is a North American species of herbaceous perennial plants of the family Asteraceae native to eastern and central Canada and eastern and central United States. It grows from Nova Scotia west to Manitoba and Minnesota south as far as northern Georgia and northern Arkansas, with a few isolated populations in Louisiana and Oklahoma.

Solidago juncea is a perennial herb up to 120 cm (4 feet) tall, spreading by means of underground rhizomes. Leaves around the base of the plant can be as much as 30 cm (1 foot) long, the leaves getting smaller higher on the stem. One plant can produce as many as 450 small yellow flower heads in a large, showy array.

Solidago juncea is often grown in gardens as an ornamental.

References

External links

Photo of herbarium specimen at Missouri Botanical Garden, collected in Missouri in 1990

Flora of Canada
Plants described in 1789
Flora of the United States
juncea